Camilla Sømod (born 27 February 1985), is a Danish athlete who competes in compound archery. She has represented the Danish national senior team since 1999. Her achievements include medals at the World Archery Championships (including gold at the Junior World Championships in 2002, FITA Archery World Cup, European Archery Championships, and becoming the world number one ranked archer in August 2009.

Camilla Sømod ended her professional career after the WORLD ARCHERY CHAMPIONSHIPS 2015 in Copenhagen.

Worklife after retirement from sports career
Since 2015 Camilla has been full time employed in the family business Sømods Bolcher. 

Sømods Bolcher was appointed a Purveyors To The Royal Danish Court in 1991. The appointment was made the same year as the companies 100th anniversary.

References

1985 births
Living people
Danish female archers
World Archery Championships medalists
Competitors at the 2013 World Games
World Games silver medalists
World Games medalists in archery
21st-century Danish women